Gostomia may refer to the following places:
Gostomia, Masovian Voivodeship (east-central Poland)
Gostomia, Opole Voivodeship (south-west Poland)
Gostomia, West Pomeranian Voivodeship (north-west Poland)